The 1968 United States presidential election in Maine took place on November 5, 1968, as part of the 1968 United States presidential election, which was held throughout all fifty states and D.C. Voters chose four representatives, or electors to the Electoral College, who voted for president and vice president.

Maine was won by incumbent Vice President Hubert Humphrey by twelve percentage points over Republican challenger and former Vice President Richard M. Nixon. Humphrey received 55.30% of the vote in Maine, which equated to 217,312 total votes to Nixon's 43.07% and 169,254 total votes. Despite Nixon squeaking by Humphrey nationwide, the Vice President's decisive victory in Maine made the state about thirteen percentage points more Democratic than the nation as a whole in 1968. Humphrey's win was almost certainly due to the popularity and consequent "favorite son" status in Maine of his running mate Edmund Muskie.

Alabama Governor George Wallace received 6,370 votes on the American Independent ticket with 1.62% of the vote. Despite his significant impact on the election as a whole, Wallace did not have a serious impact in Maine. Indeed, upstate Aroostook County was Wallace's weakest in the nation outside of the District of Columbia where he was not on the ballot.

This election made Nixon the first Republican to ever win the presidency without carrying Maine. It would also prove to be the last time that a Democratic presidential nominee would carry the state until Bill Clinton in 1992, and the last time that a Democrat would win an absolute majority of the popular vote in the state until Clinton also did so in 1996. Humphrey was also the first losing Democrat to carry the state since Lewis Cass in 1848. The state swung heavily towards Richard Nixon in 1972, awarding him over 61 percent of the vote, which no presidential candidate of either party has surpassed since.

This is the last election as of 2020 where Maine has not voted for the same candidate as fellow New England state Vermont, and one of only two such cases since 1856. Piscataquis County would never vote Democratic again until 1996, whilst Franklin, Oxford, Penobscot, Sagadahoc and Washington Counties would not vote Democratic again until 1992, and populous Cumberland County not until 1980. This is also the last time, as of 2021, that a Democrat received over 70% of the vote in any Maine county, which Humphrey did in Androscoggin County.

Maine was one of two states (the other being Washington) that supported Humphrey over Nixon in this election and Nixon over John F. Kennedy in the 1960 election.

Results

Results by county

See also
 United States presidential elections in Maine

Notes

References

Maine
1968
1968 Maine elections